Diare is a community in the Savelugu-Nanton District in the Northern Region of Ghana. It is a less populated community with nucleated settlement. Most of the inhabitants of the community are farmers especially the men.

See also
Suburbs of Savelugu-Nanton(Ghana) District

References  

Communities in Ghana